Cadlinella subornatissima is a species of sea slug or dorid nudibranch, a marine gastropod mollusk in the family Chromodorididae.

Distribution 
This species was described from Japan. It has been found in South Korea and the Marshall Islands.

Description
Cadlinella subornatissima is similar to the common species Cadlinella ornatissima but has taller tubercles which are entirely white, not tipped with pink.

Ecology

References

Chromodorididae
Gastropods described in 1996